Camellia lutchuensis is a species of camellia that is widespread in southeastern China, Taiwan, and the Ryukyu Islands of Japan. It is a shrub or small tree growing from 2–7 meters in height, with evergreen leaves and fragrant, white flowers.

Gallery

References

 J. Coll. Sci. Imp. Univ. Tokyo 12: 332 1899.
 The Plant List
 Dave's Garden

lutchuensis